The 1982 World Junior Curling Championships were held from March 14 to 21 at the Aitken Centre in Fredericton, New Brunswick, Canada. The tournament only consisted of a men's event.

Teams

Round robin

  Teams to playoffs
  Teams to tiebreaker

Tiebreaker

Playoffs

Final standings

Awards
 WJCC Sportsmanship Award:  Christoph Möckel

All-Star Team:
Skip:  Sören Grahn
Third:  Niclas Järund
Second:  Joel Gagne
Lead:  Mike Friesen

References

External links

World Junior Curling Championships
Curling competitions in Fredericton
World Junior Curling Championships
World Junior Curling Championships
International curling competitions hosted by Canada
World Junior Curling Championships
World Junior Curling Championships